The Sri Lanka worm snake (Indotyphlops lankaensis) is a species of snake in the Typhlopidae family. It is endemic to Sri Lanka.

References

Indotyphlops
Snakes of Asia
Reptiles of Sri Lanka
Endemic fauna of Sri Lanka
Reptiles described in 1947
Taxa named by Edward Harrison Taylor